George Paice (born 20 December 1941) is a New Zealand-based Falkland Islands Lawn Bowler.

Bowls career
He represented the Falkland Islands at the 2010 Commonwealth Games in Delhi India in the men's pairs alongside playing partner Gerald Reive. The pair achieved two victories at the games, over Guernsey and Samoa. Paice currently plays out of the Papatoetoe Hunters Corner Bowling Club in Auckland New Zealand.

References
 

1941 births
Living people
Falkland Islands sportspeople
People from Fox Bay
Sportspeople from Auckland
Commonwealth Games competitors for the Falkland Islands
Bowls players at the 2010 Commonwealth Games
British expatriates in New Zealand
Falkland Islands male bowls players